Jeremy Brecher is a historian, documentary filmmaker, activist, and author of books on labor and social movements.

Career

Labor History 
In 1969, Brecher and other collaborators including Paul Mattick, Jr., Stanley Aronowitz, and Peter Rachleff began sporadically publishing a magazine and pamphlet series called Root & Branch drawing on the tradition of workers councils and adapting them to contemporary America. In 1975 they published the collection Root & Branch: The Rise of the Workers’ Movements.

History from Below 
Funded by the National Endowment for the Humanities and the Connecticut Humanities Council, the project involved participation of more than 200 workers and community members who provided documents, participated in interviews, served on an advisory committee, and reviewed the project’s products.

Brecher has continued to create community-based historical and cultural products in the Naugatuck Valley. From 1988 to 1996 the Waterbury Ethnic Music Project collected and recorded hundreds of songs and tunes in more than 20 ethnic groups and produced 13 public radio programs in the Brass City Music series and the public television documentary Brass City Music as well as six Brass Valley Music Festivals. He served as project historian for the exhibit Brass Roots at Waterbury’s Mattatuck Museum, which received 900,000 visitors between 1986 and 2005. He also served as project historian for the Mattatuck Museum’s new permanent exhibit, Coming Home, Building Community in a Changing World, which won the 2010 Wilbur Cross Award of the Connecticut Humanities Council for “Exemplary Public Programming.” Between 1990 and 2006 he served as project historian for a series of oral history projects and community exhibits on neighborhoods and the African American, Jewish, and Puerto Rican communities in Waterbury.

Professor Robert Forrant of the University of Massachusetts Lowell wrote in the ILR Review, “Brecher employs his knowledge of labor history and a great capacity for listening to his interviewees to tell the story of the Naugatuck Valley Project’s (NVP) success in keeping open nearly a dozen industrial plants and eventually starting new employee-owned businesses.”

In 1984, Brecher and associates formed Stone Soup, Inc. a non-profit educational and cultural organization based in Connecticut. Over the succeeding decades it produced dozens of videos, TV and radio programs, books, curricula, community programs, cultural festivals, and other educational products.

Cornwall in Pictures: A Visual Reminiscence, 1868-1941, published in 2001 in collaboration with a local community working group in Brecher’s home town of Cornwall, CT was favorably reviewed by the New York Times on its publication in 2001; and later received a 2003 Certificate of Commendation from the American Association for State and Local History.

Brecher’s “history from below” work has pioneered what historical theorist Michael Frisch has called “shared authority” between history professionals and the communities they study and address. According to historian James R. Green, the “exciting use of oral history” as a “record of how people told their stories and made their own historical interpretations” was “epitomized in the work of Jeremy Brecher and his colleagues.”

Connecticut Public History 
From 1989 to 2001 Brecher served as Humanities Scholar-in-Residence at Connecticut Public Television and Radio, a position supported by the Connecticut Humanities Council.  He wrote the scripts for the documentaries The Roots of Roe, Schools in Black and White, Rust Valley, The Amistad Revolt, Electronic Road Film, Brass City Music, and Dance on the Wind, the last two of which he co-produced.

Brecher developed and supervised the CPTV series The Connecticut Experience which included more than twenty documentaries on Connecticut topics. In 1995 the Federation of State Humanities Councils Schwartz Prize citation called The Connecticut Experience “A superb example of Council-conducted initiative, joining the best talents of the council with those of the television profession to produce programs of prize-winning quality and broad appeal. In addition to the triumph in media-program administration, by using the humanities to illuminate specific, complex issues currently confronting the state, it produced the most comprehensive and effective contribution, by any council project we know of, to the self-definition of the state.”

A list of many of the documentaries Brecher wrote and/or co-produced can be found listed under the "filmography" section.

Brecher, with collaborators, was producer, writer, and host of Connecticut Public Radio’s Remembering Connecticut, which broadcast more than 80 radio programs on a wide variety of Connecticut topics. The Oral History Review called Remembering Connecticut “One of the most ambitious, and certainly the longest-running, radio history series in the United States. . . Historically grounded to a degree rare in programming of this sort. . . Accessible, engaging, and far ranging.” A list of over fifty episodes can be found below under the section "Radio Credits".

In 2000 Brecher received the Connecticut Humanities Council Wilber Cross Award for Humanities Scholar of the Year.

Globalization 
In 2005, Tim Costello asked Brecher and Brendan Smith to collaborate in creating an organization called Global Labor Strategies (GLS) “to contribute to building global labor solidarity through research, analysis, strategic thinking, and network building around labor and employment issues.” In 2006 GLS discovered a debate unfolding in China about a Labor Contract Law whose key provisions were being opposed by the American and European Chambers of Commerce. Global Labor Strategies organized an international protest against this corporate opposition in the aftermath of which  international union federations pressured their employers to reverse course; human rights organizations mobilized support for Chinese workers' rights; US members of Congress introduced legislation decrying the corporate intervention and apparent administration complicity; and China's official labor organization, the All-China Federation of Trade Unions (ACFTU), took a strong stand against corporate pressure. This innovative work was prematurely ended by Costello’s death in 2009.

Climate Protection 
Brecher first became aware of the threat of global warming in the early 1970s from the writings of social ecologist Murray Bookchin. In Common Sense for Hard Times, Brecher and Costello, citing Barry Commoner, warned that environmental degradation could destroy the capability of the environment to support a reasonably civilized human society.

Activism 

Starting in the 1970s, Brecher helped publish Root & Branch and Commonwork Pamphlets, which published his writings opposing reinstitution of the military draft. In the 1980s and 1990s he was active in the Campaign on Contingent Work, the North American Federation for Fair Employment, and the Naugatuck Valley Project. He was arrested for occupying the office of Rep. Nancy Johnson in a protest against the mining of Nicaragua harbors.

In the 2000s he helped organize the Iraq Pledge of Resistance, the Iraq Moratorium, War Crimes Watch, and Global Labor Strategies and with Jill Cutler and Brendan Smith edited the collection In the Name of Democracy: American War Crimes in Iraq and Beyond which Booklist described as an “excellent anthology” that includes “interviews, FBI documents, legal briefs, and statements by soldiers turned resisters, all offering a chilling look at how the war was begun and is currently operating.” In the 2010s he helped form Labor Network for Sustainability and the Connecticut Roundtable on Climate and Jobs. He helped support and wrote extensively about Occupy Wall Street. Brecher was arrested in the first KXL pipeline protests at the White House in 2011.

Filmography 

 Schools in Black and White (1991)
 The Roots of Roe (1994)
 Rust Valley (1995)
African Americans in Connecticut:  Civil War to Civil Rights (1998)

Published works 

 Common Preservation: In a Time of Mutual Destruction (Oakland, CA: PM Press, 2020) 
Strike! 50th Anniversary Edition (Oakland, CA: PM Press, 2020) 
Save the Humans? Common Preservation in Action Revised: Expanded and Updated Edition (Oakland, CA: PM Press, 2020) 
Against Doom: A Climate Insurgency Manual (Oakland, CA: PM Press, 2017) 
Climate Insurgency: A Strategy for Survival, (Boulder, CO: Paradigm publishers, 2015). 
 Strike! Revised: Expanded, and updated edition (Oakland, CA: PM Press, 2014) 
 Save the Humans? Common Preservation in Action (Boulder, CO: Paradigm publishers, 2012) 
 Banded Together: Economic Democratization in the Brass Valley (Urbana: University of Illinois Press, 2011) 
 In the Name of Democracy: American War Crimes in Iraq and Beyond (Edited with Jill Cutler and Brendan Smith) (New York: Metropolitan Books, 2005) 
 Cornwall in Pictures: A Visual Reminiscence 1868-1941 (Cornwall, CT: Cornwall Historical Society, 2001) 
 Globalization from Below: The Power of Solidarity (with Tim Costello and Brendan Smith) (Cambridge. South End Press, 2000) 
 Global Visions: Beyond the New World Order (ed, with John Brown Childs and Jill Cutler) (Boston. South End Press, 1993) 
 Global Village vs. Global Pillage: A One-World Strategy for Labor (with Tim Costello) (Washington, D.C. International Labor Rights Education and Research Fund, 1991)   
 Brass Valley: The Story of Working People's Lives and Struggles in an American Industrial Region (ed., with Jerry Lombardi and Jan Stackhouse) (Philadelphia. Temple University Press, 1982) 
 Common Sense for Hard Times (Second Edition) (Washington, D.C./New York. Institute for Policy Studies/Two Continents Publishing Group, 1976 Boston/New York. South End Press/Two Continents Publishing Group, 1977)

References

American social workers
American non-fiction writers
Year of birth missing (living people)
Living people